The Valley Golf Course is an 18-hole municipal golf course located in Burlington, North Carolina. It is owned and operated by the city of Burlington. Prior to 2021, it was known as Indian Valley. 

The Valley is an 18-hole, par-70 golf course that is open year round to the general public. The course has held several competitive tournaments in recent years, including the Elon University Family Weekend Golf Tournament. The course was built in 1968, and designed by Ellis Maples.

The Valley has hosted the Alamance All-County High School Golf Championships for several years, as well as several local mid-amateur tournaments in the past.

History 

Indian Valley Golf Course was constructed on the banks of the Haw River in Burlington in 1968 and was designed by Ellis Maples. The course has been owned and operated by the city of Burlington since its inception. The main goal of the course is and has been to provide affordable golf for any level of golfer in the Triad region of North Carolina. Soon after the construction of the course, the driving range was added to the facility, which is also accessible to the public.

In 2021, the golf course was rebranded, and is now operated as "The Valley Golf Course."

Tournaments 

The Valley has hosted several competitive tournaments in its history, including recent mid-amateur tournaments in the summer of 2013 and the annual Elon University Family Weekend Tournament. The course has held the Alamance County Amateur, the Alamance County All-County High School Tournament, and the Alamance County Senior Amateur in recent years.

Hole by hole walkthrough 

1st Hole: From the black tees, a 360-yard hole with a sharp dogleg left. The tee shot requires the player to hit their shot approximately 220 yards to clear the corner of the dogleg. There is a small pond short and left of the green.

2nd Hole: From the black tees, a 414-yard par four with
another dogleg left. This hole features a severe valley once
the hole gets to the corner of the dogleg, with the green
being only slightly below the approach shot area.

3rd Hole: From the black tees, this 593-yard straightaway
par five is the most difficult hole and the course and is
officially the number one stroke hole. The tee shot requires
a right to left shot shape, and a three shot approach is 
needed to reach the green even for long hitters.

4th Hole: From the black tees, a long 191-yard par three
that plays long despite being substantially downhill. 
Featuring two bunkers in front and a large mound in the
back, this green is well protected.

5th Hole: From the black tees, this par four is 406-yards 
and features another severe dogleg to the left. The tee
shot is daunting; the drive must carry at least 200 yards
to clear the corner of the dogleg, and the fairway is well
bunkered on the right side with trees lining the left. The 
green is relatively open, and downhill from the approach
area.

6th Hole: 402-yards from the black tees, another par four
that features a difficult shot shape of the tee. This time
the golfer needs to hit the ball left to right in order to keep 
it in the fairway, as well as avoid a fairway bunker about
230 yards from the tee to the right of the fairway.

7th Hole: This hole is 436-yards from the black tees, and 
is relatively straightaway but requires a tee shot that can 
be snared by trees on the left and right of the fairway. 
Also, the green has bunkers short right and deep left of it.

8th Hole: This hole is a downhill, 194-yard par three that 
includes a large pond short left of the green, and a large
bunker to the front right of the green. There is very little 
room to miss the green on this hole.

9th Hole: Another sharp dogleg left, the fairway falls
downhill left to right for its entirety. This feeds into a stand
of trees on the right side of the fairway. There’s also a pond
beyond the green with a severe downslope feeding off the
back of the green to the water, and a bunker short left of
the green. This hole is 365-yards long.

10th Hole: This hole is a short, but narrow par four only
334-yards long with several prominent fairway bunkers
but a relatively accessible green with ample space around
it to miss.

11th Hole: This short, downhill par four features a difficult tee shot from an accuracy standpoint, but
little distance. There is a large bunker in the center of the fairway, and a sharp dogleg to the right, but
the fact that this hole is severely downhill and only 357-yards makes it relatively easy.

12th Hole: The easier holes to start out the back nine ends on the 12th hole. It is a long, 525-yard par
five that requires a difficult tee shot that demands the golfer carry at least 200 yards of hazard to
reach the fairway, which then doglegs substantially right. From there, it is most likely a three 
shot approach for the average golfer, and the approach shot must negotiate an uphill shot to a green surrounded by three bunkers and the Haw River short of it, which dashes any hopes at 
reaching this difficult par five in two shots.

13th Hole: This hole presents a break for the golfer after the difficult twelfth hole. It is a 
166-yard par three over a pond that rarely comes into play. There is only one bunker on the
front left of the green. It is the 15th hole on the stroke index.

14th Hole: Slightly more difficult than the thirteenth hole, this hole presents the golfer with a wide-
open tee shot to a dogleg left. It is 394-yards uphill, but is forgiving with one of the larger fairways on
the course. The green has only a large mound behind it to convolute errant approach shots.

15th Hole: Similar to the tee shot on the 12th hole, this drive requires about 200 yards of carry,
to an uphill fairway in order to carry the corner of a dogleg right. This is the sixth highest stroke hole,
and measures at 405-yards. The green features a large bunkers short left of it.

16th Hole: The longest par three on the course, the sixteenth hole is 201-yards straightaway to a well
protected green. There are bunkers short left and short right, as well as mounds around the back and 
front of the green, it is a monster par three and the most difficult on the course from a stroke average
standpoint.

17th Hole: This hole is 435-yards from the black tees, and has a relatively open tee shot but requires 
the golfer to be slightly right of center in order to avoid a massive oak tree that blocks approach shots
from the left side. It is a difficult hole featuring a dogleg left, and a large bunker short of the green, as well as out of bounds on the right side of the fairway.

18th Hole: This finishing hole features the most water on the entire course. The tee shot needs to 
carry a large pond and a bunker to reach a small patch of fairway that sets the golfer up for an uphill 
approach shot over another pond of similar size. The green is well protected by mounds on all sides, 
and the hole measures at 432-yards.

Course designer 
The Vakkey Golf Course was designed by Ellis Maples (1909-1984), who was a prolific golf course 
designer and architect throughout North Carolina. Maples began working on golf courses under the 
tutelage of the arguably the greatest designer to have ever lived, Donald Ross. Maples got his start in 
golf course design under his father, who was the construction superintendent at Pinehurst Country 
Club for the construction of the first four courses. He served in the U.S. Armed Forces during 
World War II, then in 1953 he opened his own golf course architectural firm. Maples and his company went 
on to design over 70 courses in the Southeast region over the next thirty years, including Indian 
Valley Golf Course and Pinehurst #5. Ellis Maples died in 1984 and his son Dan Maples 
took over the family golf course design company.

References 

Golf clubs and courses in North Carolina